Red bug may refer to:

Tegastes acroporanus a coral parasite, known in the reef-keeping hobby as "red bugs"
Red Bug, North Carolina
Auto Red Bug, an automobile manufactured 1916-1920 by the American Motor Vehicle Company in Lafayette, Indiana 
Pyrrhocoridae, a family of insects
Smith Flyer, an automobile manufactured 1915-1919 by the A.O. Smith Company in Milwaukee, Wisconsin
Trombicula, a genus of harvest mites

Animal common name disambiguation pages